The R267 road is a regional road in County Donegal, Ireland. The road links  Donegal Town with the N15, a road which runs around the eastern and south-eastern edge of Donegal Town. The N15 forms part of the main road between Derry and Sligo Town.

See also 

 Roads in Ireland
 National primary road
 National secondary road

References 

Regional roads in the Republic of Ireland
Roads in County Donegal